Nadaaniyaan is a Pakistani comedy sitcom broadcast by the Geo TV. The sitcom was written by Ali Raza Khan, directed by Yasir Nawaz, and produced by Nida Yasir. The show stars Danish Nawaz, Yasir Nawaz, Nida Yasir as fictionalized versions of themselves and Mirza Shahi in lead roles. An Indian remake of the show telecasted on BIG Magic. It lasted from September 9, 2013, to January 23, 2017.

Plot 
What you get when you bring together a clueless husband, his ditzy wife, and his clumsy little brother? Much Nadaaniyaan, of course. The story follows the life of Yasir, his wife Nida, his brother Danish and their quirky neighbor, Batuta Chacha Kamal. Watch as they get into all sorts of trouble, sometimes fooling those around them and sometimes being taken for a ride themselves.

Cast

Main characters 
 Danish Nawaz as himself
 Yasir Nawaz as himself
 Nida Yasir as herself
 Mirza Shahi as Batuta Chacha Kamal

Recurring characters 
 Badar Khalil as Badar Khala, Yasir's aunt (appeared in mostly episodes)

Supporting characters 
 Sajal Aly as Sumbul (episodic role)
 Mohib Mirza as Ishrat Baji (To promote his show Hum Tum)
 Salman Sheikh as himself (episodic role)
 Uroosa Siddiqui as herself (episodic role)
 Mustafa Qureshi as himself (Eid-ul-Azha special)
 Neelam Muneer as herself
 Hina Dilpazeer as Chef Rahat in chef in Naadiyaan
 Ayaz Khan as Police Ayaz Sahab 
 Bushra Ansari as Danish and Yasir's elder sister
 Ismail Tara
 Aamer Akhter as Psycho Doctor
 Mahjabeen Habib
 Ashraf khan as Nida's boss in episode 46
 Umer Shareef as a film director in episode 93, 94 and 95
 Humayun Saeed as himself
 Moin Akhter as PK Uncle

Sequel series 
A sequel to the series called Phir Say Nadaaniyan that takes place in the modern world, was announced in October 2022 as the form of a web series with the main cast returning, (with the exception of Mirza Shahi, who passed away from Covid-19) in 2020. The trailer for the series was released on 17 of Dec, 2022. The theme song was released on 19 of Dec, 2022. The first episode was released on the YouTube channel, Farid Nawaz Productions on 21 of Dec, 2022 with following episodes releasing weekly.

References

External links 
 Nadaaniyaan's official website
 

2009 Pakistani television series debuts
Geo TV original programming
Urdu-language television shows
Pakistani television sitcoms
Pakistani comedy television series